Nick Smith may refer to:

Politicians
Nick Smith (British politician) (born 1960), Labour Member of Parliament for Blaenau Gwent
Nick Smith (American politician) (born 1934), American congressman from Michigan
Nick Smith (New Zealand politician) (born 1964), Member of Parliament for Nelson

Others
Nick Smith (milliner) (born 1981), British socialite, designer, author, recording artist, actor and philanthropist
Nick Smith (footballer, born 1984), Australian rules football player for Melbourne
Nick Smith (footballer, born 1988), Australian rules football player for the Sydney Swans
Nick Smith (Home and Away), character in the Australian television soap opera Home and Away
Nick Smith (ice hockey) (born 1979), Canadian NHL player with the Florida Panthers
Nick Smith (canoeist) (born 1969), British slalom canoer
Nick Smith (basketball), basketball player
Nicholas J. J. Smith, Australian philosopher

See also
Nicholas Smith (disambiguation)
Nicky Smith (disambiguation)